India Mobile Congress 2018 (IMC) was a technology event and international conference jointly organised by the Cellular Operators Association of India (COAI) and the Department of Telecommunications, Government of India. IMC 2018 was the second edition of the iconic India Mobile Congress event that is held annually in New Delhi, India. It was held at Aerocity, New Delhi from 25 October 2018 to 27 October 2018.

The main thrust area at IMC 2018 was the potential of 5G technology and its use cases. A number of companies presented their roadmaps for their readiness for deployment of 5G technology in India. The India Mobile Congress 2018 was awarded as "The Knowledge Hub" at Exhibition Excellence Awards 2019 held in Expo Center, Greater Noida in March 2019.

Inauguration  
The inauguration of IMC2018 took place on 25 October 2019, around 10am. The three-day international event was inaugurated by Manoj Sinha, Minister of State (Independent Charge) for Communications and Minister of State for Railways. A number of important industry stakeholders, ministers and experts attended the inaugural session, such as:

Indian government officials 
Ravi Shankar Prasad, Minister of Electronics and Information Technology and Law & Justice
Suresh Prabhu, Minister of Commerce & Industry and Civil Aviation
Hardeep Singh Puri, Minister of State (Independent Charge) for Housing & Urban Affairs
Aruna Sundararajan, Secretary (T) & Chairperson, Telecom Commission

International policy makers 
Tram Iv Tek, Minister of Posts & Telecommunications, Cambodia
 U Thant Sin Maung, Union Minister for Transportation & Communications, Myanmar;
 Bounsaleumsay Khennavong, Lao PDR; and
 H.E. Gokul Prasad Baskota, Minister for Communications and Information Technology, Nepal

Industry stakeholders 
 Dr Youngky Kim, President and Head of Samsung Networks
 Vivek Badrinath, Regional CEO, Africa Middle East Asia Pacific, Vodafone Group
Sunil Bharti Mittal, Founder and chairman, Bharti Enterprises
Mukesh Ambani, chairman, Reliance Industries Limited
Kumar Mangalam Birla, chairman, Aditya Birla Group

The crowd of over 5000 visitors for the inaugural ceremony included policy makers, ambassadors, opinion makers, change agents, bureaucrats and investors from over 20 countries.

International Conference 
The high caliber three-day international conference is one of the main things that sets India Mobile Congress apart from other technology and telecom exhibitions in the region. IMC attracts the biggest and the most famous international speakers in the telecom and technology space and that makes it a popular choice for Indian and foreign delegates, including tech enthusiasts, young professionals, businessmen, industry leaders, analysts, media persons and students.

IMC 2019 also saw the presence of high-level ministerial delegations from several BIMSTEC and ASEAN countries. Ministers from the European Commission, Cambodia, Myanmar, Nepal, and Lao PDR led their respective delegations, and participated in plenary sessions that were focused on the specific needs, challenges, and opportunities applicable to member countries of these regional forums.

Theme 
The theme for the 2018 edition of India Mobile Congress was "New Digital Horizons – Connect. Create. Innovate."

Sessions

Top Speakers 

 Ajit Pai
 Andrus Ancip
 Johannes Gungl
 Kumar Mangalam Birla
 Mukesh Ambani
 R.S.Sharma
 Sunil Bharti Mittal 
 Youngky Kim

Exhibition

Event partners 
There were a number of high-profile brands that partnered with IMC for the 2018 edition including Samsung, Huawei, Qualcomm, Tech Mahindra, Facebook, Google, and several others.

Top exhibitors

List of start-ups

Key Highlights and Announcements 
A number of key announcements were made at the India Mobile Congress.

Awards and recognition 
India Mobile Congress won the award for "The Knowledge Hub" at the Exhibition Excellence Awards 2019 held at Expo Center, Greater Noida on 23 March 2019.

References

External links 
 Official website
 Cellular Operators Association of India

Telecommunication conferences